Maizaniidae is a family of minute land snails with an operculum, terrestrial gastropod mollusks in the superfamily Cyclophoroidea (according to the taxonomy of the Gastropoda by Bouchet & Rocroi, 2005).

This family has no subfamilies.

Genera
Genera within the family Maizaniidae include:
 Maizania Bourguignat, 1889 - the type genus of the family
 Maizaniella Bequaert & Clench, 1836 	 
 Neomaizania Van Bruggen, 1985 	 
 Thomeomaizania Bequeart and Clench, 1936

References

External links